La Coyota is a 1987 Mexican action drama film directed by Luis Quintanilla Rico and starring Beatriz Adriana, Juan Valentín, Jorge Vargas and Miguel Ángel Rodríguez.

Plot
The film follows the bitter life of Rosalba (Adriana), a woman who has been abused by power since childhood. She becomes a cold and heartless woman, living only for revenge and hatred. However, she opens her heart to Dr. Ramiro Fuentes (Vargas), but the fact that Rosalba has inadvertently made Chencho (Valentín) fall in love with her complicates matters.

Cast
Beatriz Adriana as Rosalba
Katy as child Rosalba (as La niña Katy)
Juan Valentín as Chencho
Jorge Vargas as Dr. Ramiro Fuentes
Marco Antonio Solís as Casimiro
Miguel Ángel Rodríguez as Don Julián
Lorenzo de Monteclaro as Justo
Roberto Cañedo as Don Germán, Casimiro's father
Noé Murayama as Lucio
Carlos y José as Singers
Las Jilguerillas as Singers
Alfredo Gutiérrez as Pánfilo
Arturo Benavides as Mayor
José Chávez as Mauro (as José Chávez Trowe)
Ernesto Juárez as Heronio
Alfredo Arroyo as Chencho's brother
Patricia Páramo
Inés Murillo as Juana, maid
María Luciano
Raúl Valerio as Don Nabor
Ramiro Ramírez as Farmhand
Jesús Gómez as Farmhand
José Luis Rojas	
José Luis Avendaño
Roberto Ruy
Rubén Márquez as Elderly farmhand
Arturo Fernández (as Arturo Delgadillo)
Martín Brek
Silvia Derbez as Doña Remedios

References

Bibliography
Zavala, Iván. El año pasado, 1987. Plaza y Valdés, 1988.
Kanoussi, Dora. El pensamiento conservador en México. Plaza y Valdes, 2002.
Amador, María Luisa; Ayala Blanco, Jorge. Cartelera cinematográfica, 1980-1989. UNAM, 2006.

External links

1980s action drama films
Mexican action drama films
1987 drama films
1987 films
1980s Mexican films
1980s Spanish-language films